The Colorado Springs Independent (commonly referred to as The Independent or simply The Indy) is a newsweekly that serves the Pikes Peak region of Southern Colorado (El Paso, Teller, and Pueblo counties). It is Colorado Springs's largest locally owned media company. In addition to its newspaper, the Indy publishes a website, IndyBlast (opt-in newsletter), an Annual Manual called the Insider and a host of smaller publication on everything from food (dish) to medical marijuana (ReLeaf). It also owns the Colorado Springs Business Journal.

History
The Independent was founded in late 1993 by John Weiss and Kathryn Carpenter Eastburn. The pair started the paper to provide "...informative, entertaining and thought provoking..." articles. The paper was initially available on Wednesdays locally and was also featured as a supplement to the Thursday edition of the Denver Post. Later changed to Thursdays, the paper is back to a Wednesday release date, can be home delivered along with the Sunday Denver Post, and still includes local news, opinions, and food, film, music, and culture articles.

Best of Colorado Springs
Annually The Independent publishes the results of a readers poll on a variety of businesses, people and activities in the Pikes Peak region. The results cover food and drink in one issue with a follow up of services and attractions the following issue.

Indy Music Awards
In 2011 The Colorado Springs Independent started the Indy Music Awards as a way to help put Colorado Springs on the map for its local musicians. Independent readers voted for their favorite local artists in more than a dozen musical categories. Winners were profiled in the Local Music Issue and subsequently performed at the inaugural Indy Music Awards Festival.

In 2012 it was brought back, but on a larger scale. For 2012 new categories were added to the awards, as well as having a larger winner's showcase at Stargazers theater in Colorado Springs.

Location

The Independents location on 235 S. Nevada is a historic building in downtown Colorado Springs, the old United Brethren Church built starting in 1912 and finished in 1917. The long building time was a result of fundraising problems as well as World War I. It was designed by architect Thomas MacLaren and is built in the Romanesque Revival style. The basement of the building was initially the home of the Tourist Memorial Church in 1912 and when the upper levels were completed in 1917 it was renamed to the United Brethren Church as can be seen on the cornerstone of the building. The building was added on during the 1950s and 1960s then again recently before being purchased by The Independent.

Starbucks controversy
In December 2007 the Starbucks coffee chain, after a single complaint from a customer suggesting The Independent was trashy or lewd, discontinued distribution of the paper in their stores. This ban was challenged by Independent publisher John Weiss, but the chain responded that it has a non-solicitation policy, and that it only carries The New York Times and the Colorado Springs Gazette. The Independent published numerous letters to the editor from angry readers, but Starbucks' position remained unchanged. This was similar to a ban by the King Soopers grocery store chain in 1999, but the stores eventually allowed the paper again after repeated complaints to the corporate headquarters by shoppers.

See also
The Gazette (Colorado Springs)

Notes

Newspapers published in Colorado
Mass media in Colorado Springs, Colorado
Alternative weekly newspapers published in the United States